Washington's 38th legislative district is one of forty-nine districts in Washington state for representation in the state legislature.

The district's legislators are state senator June Robinson and state representatives Julio Cortes (position 1) and Marry Fosse (position 2), all Democrats.

See also
Washington Redistricting Commission
Washington State Legislature
Washington State Senate
Washington House of Representatives

References

External links
Washington State Redistricting Commission
Washington House of Representatives
Map of Legislative Districts

38